Elise Hofmann (5 February 1889 – 14 March 1955 ) was an Austrian paleobotanist and geologist. Born in Vienna, she graduated from the University of Vienna in 1920. She produced over 120 works, including the 1934 book Palaeohistologie der Pflanze (Paleohistology of the Plant).

References

Further reading

1889 births
1955 deaths
Paleobotanists
Austrian paleontologists
Austrian women scientists
Academic staff of the University of Vienna
Scientists from Vienna
20th-century women scientists